Jean-Claude Tardif (born in 1964) is the Director of the Research Center at the Montreal Heart Institute and Professor of Medicine at the University of Montreal. He received his medical degree (MD) in 1987 from the University of Montreal and specialized in cardiology and research in Montreal and Boston until 1994. Dr. Tardif holds the Canada Research Chair in personalized medicine and the University of Montreal endowed research chair in atherosclerosis. He is also the Scientific Director of the Montreal Health Innovations Coordinating Center (MHICC).

His research covers the molecular and genomic aspects of atherosclerosis and related diseases and also involves animal models, mechanistic and observational clinical studies as well as early clinical trials and large international randomized clinical trials. Dr. Tardif is or has been the international principal investigator or part of the study leadership of several large clinical trials in the field of atherosclerosis and other cardiovascular diseases. Dr. Tardif and his team have created the Beaulieu-Saucier Pharmacogenomics Center at the Montreal Heart Institute and he has created the Center of Excellence in Personalized Medicine, the latter funded by the Network of Centers of Excellence of Canada and which has also been supported by multiple pharmaceutical and biotechnological companies.

Dr. Tardif has authored more than 750 scientific articles and has won multiple awards, including the Research Achievement Award of the Canadian Cardiovascular Society, the Distinguished Lecturer Award of the Canadian Institutes for Health Research, the Genesis Award of BIOQuébec (for his outstanding contributions to life sciences), the Armand-Frappier Award of the Government of Québec (the highest scientific honour) and the Margolese National Heart Disorders Prize (for his outstanding contributions to the treatment, amelioration, or cure of heart disorders). Because of his accomplishments, Dr. Tardif was named Fellow of the Canadian Academy of Health Sciences and Fellow of the Royal Society of Canada and was inducted in the Order of Canada (the highest distinction in the country).

Early life 
Jean-Claude Tardif was born in Laval, Quebec, Canada in 1964. He attended the University of Montreal where he received his MD degree in 1987. Tardif completed his residency at Maisonneuve-Rosemont and Notre-Dame hospitals in Montreal, Canada in 1990. Subsequently, he completed his cardiology fellowship at Sacré-Coeur Hospital and at the Montreal Heart Institute and then his research fellowship at the New England Medical Center of Tufts University School of Medicine in Boston, Massachusetts.

Career 
In his work as a clinical trialist, Tardif has designed, conducted, and served as Principal Investigator for trials like COLCOT, Dal-Gene, INITIATIVE and SPIRE. His work contributed to the approval of low-dose colchicine by Health Canada for the prevention of atherothrombotic events in patients with coronary artery disease and its entry into the European guidelines and South American guidelines for cardiovascular prevention.

Academic appointments 

 1987-1988, Assistant chief resident, Hôpital Maisonneuve-Rosemont, Montreal, Canada
 1991, Chief resident, Montreal Heart Institute, Montreal, Canada
 1991-1992, Resident representative, Cardiology University Department, Université de Montréal
 1992-1924, Instructor of Medicine, Tufts University School of Medicine, New England Medical Center, Boston, Massachusetts
 1994-present, Cardiologist, Montreal Heart Institute, Montreal, Canada
 1994-present, Director, Intravascular Ultrasound Core Laboratory, Montreal Heart Institute, Montreal, Canada 
 1994-1999, Assistant Professor of Medicine, Montreal Heart Institute, Université de Montréal, Montreal, Canada
 1999-2006, Associate Professor of Medicine, Montreal Heart Institute, Université de Montréal, Montreal, Canada
 1999-2004, Director of Clinical Research, Research Center, Montreal Heart Institute, Montreal, Canada
 2003-present, Director, Research Chair, Pfizer Endowed Research Chair in Atherosclerosis, Université de Montréal, Montreal, Canada
 2004-present, Director, Research Center, Montreal Heart Institute, Montreal, Canada
 2005-2009, Director, Quebec Cardiovascular Health Network (RSCV), Quebec Health Research Fund (FRSQ)
 2006-present, Professor of Medicine, Montreal Heart Institute, Université de Montréal, Montreal, Canada
 2012-2025, Director, Research Chair, Canada Research Chair in Translational and Personalized Medicine

Honors and awards 

 1980, Best High School graduate award, College Laval
 1982-1983, University scholarship, Université de Montréal
 1987, Rodolphe Boulet-Sandoz award of excellence in medicine at graduation
 1987, Ciba-Geigy award of excellence in clinical medicine at medical graduation
 1989, Merck award of excellence in clinical research, Quebec internist meeting
 1991, Wyeth award of excellence in cardiology, Université de Montreal
 1992-1924, McLaughlin Foundation of Canada, Grant for research fellowship
 1998, First Martial Bourassa Award for excellence in research, Montreal Heart Institute
 1999, Carsley Foundation Award for excellence in research, Montreal Heart Inst.
 2003-2007,Canadian Institutes of Health Research and Pfizer Research chair in atherosclerosis
 2004, Quebec Society of Lipidology, Nutrition and Metabolism, Founders' Award
 2004, Montreal La Presse, Personality of the week
 2007, Fellow, Canadian Academy of Health Sciences
 2008, Canadian Cardiovascular Society, Research Achievement Award
 2008, Montreal La Presse, Personality of the week
 2008, Montreal La Presse, Personality of the year
 2011, Bio-Quebec Genesis Brio Award
 2011, Armand-Frappier Award, Government of Québec
 2013, Quebec Heart and Stroke Foundation, Cœur Québec Argent Award
 2014-2015, Professor of the year, Department of Medicine, Université de Montréal
 2014, Member of the Order of Canada, Government of Canada
 2015, Distinguished Lecturer in Cardiovascular Sciences, Canadian Institutes of Health Research's Institute of Circulatory Health Award
 2015, Fellow, European Society of Cardiology
 2016, Fellow, Canadian Cardiovascular Society
 2021, Margolese National Heart Disorders Prize
 2021, Recognition Award, Department of Medicine, Université de Montréal
 2022, Member, Royal Society of Canada

References 
1- Tardif JC, Rhéaume E, Lemieux-Perreault LP, Grégoire JC, Feroz Zada Y, Asselin G, Provost S, Barhdadi A, Rhainds D, L’Allier PL, Ibrahim R, Upmanyu R, Niesor EJ, Benghozi R, Suchankova G, Laghrissi-Thode F, Guertin MC, Olsson AG, Mongrain I, Schwartz GG, Dubé MP. Pharmacogenomic determinants of the cardiovascular effects of dalcetrapib. Circ Cardiovasc Genet 2015;8:372-382.

This pharmacogenomic study of approximately 6000 patients with coronary artery disease suggested that the effects of the CETP inhibitor dalcetrapib on both cardiovascular outcomes and atherosclerosis imaging are determined by polymorphisms in the ADCY9 gene. Patients with the AA genotype at polymorphism rs1967309 had a 39% reduction in cardiovascular outcomes when treated with dalcetrapib versus placebo.

2- Ridker PM, Revkin J, Amarenco P, Brunell R, Curto M, Civeira F, Flather M, Glynn RJ, Gregoire J, Jukema JW, Karpov Y, Kastelein JJP, Koenig W, Lorenzatti A, Manga P, Masiukiewicz U, Miller M, Mosterd A, Murin J, Nicolau JC, Nissen S, Ponikowski P, Santos RD, Schwartz PM, Soran H, White H, Wright RS, Vrablik M, Yunis C, Shear Cl, Tardif JC. Cardiovascular efficacy and safety of bococizumab in high risk patients. N Engl J Med 2017;376:1527-1539.

In these large phase 3 randomized clinical trials of 27,438 patients, the PCSK9 inhibitor bococizumab was shown to reduce the rate of cardiovascular events in higher-risk patients but not in those at lower risk.

3- Lincoff AM, Tardif JC, Schwartz GG, Nicholls SJ, Rydén L, Neal B, Malmberg K, Wedel H, Buse JB, Henry RR, Weichert A, Cannata R, Svensson A, Volz D, Grobbee DE; AleCardio Investigators. Effect of aleglitazar on cardiovascular outcomes after acute coronary syndrome in patients with type 2 diabetes mellitus: the alecardio randomized clinical trial. JAMA 2014; 311:1515-1525.

In this large phase 3 randomized clinical trial, the dual PPAR agonist aleglitazar did not provide cardiovascular benefits in 7226 patients with diabetes and a recent acute coronary syndrome.

4- Pfeffer MA, Claggett B, Diaz R, Dickstein K, Gerstein HC, Køber LV, Lawson FC, Ping L, Wei X, Lewis EF, Maggioni AP, McMurray JJ, Probstfield JL, Riddle MC, Solomon SD, Tardif JC. Lixisenatide in patients with type 2 diabetes and acute coronary syndrome. N Engl J Med 2015;373:2247-2257.

In this large-scale randomized clinical trial, the effects of the GLP-1 receptor agonist lixisenatide on cardiovascular outcomes were evaluated in 7000 patients with diabetes and a recent acute coronary syndrome.

5- Tardif JC, Kouz S, Waters DD, et al. Efficacy and safety of low-dose colchicine after myocardial infarction. N Engl J Med 2019;38:2497-2505. 
This international randomized trial of 4745 patients showed that the anti-inflammatory medication colchicine reduces the risk of ischemic cardiovascular events (including strokes) after a myocardial infarction. These results contributed to the approval of colchicine by Health Canada for the prevention of atherothrombotic events in patients with coronary artery disease and its entry in the European guidelines and South American guidelines for cardiovascular prevention.

References

Canadian cardiologists
Academic staff of the Université de Montréal
Université de Montréal alumni